The Manohar Parrikar Institute for Defence Studies and Analyses (MP-IDSA) (formerly known as: Institute for Defence Studies and Analyses (IDSA)), New Delhi, is India's foremost think tank for advanced research in international relations, especially defence, strategic and security issues, and providing training to civilian, military and paramilitary officers of the Indian government. It is funded by the Indian Ministry of Defence but operates as a non-partisan and autonomous body. It aims to promote national and international security by carrying out research on defence and security-related issues and disseminating the knowledge among the policy-makers and wider public.

The current director general is Ambassador Sujan R. Chinoy, who took over the reins of IDSA on 3 January 2019 on a three-year assignment. MP-IDSA is the only think-tank in India whose director general is appointed by the Appointments Committee of the Cabinet, chaired by the prime minister of India.

IDSA has long been regarded as one of India's most influential think-tanks. The University of Pennsylvania's Global Go To Think Tank Index ranked IDSA 41st in the world in 2017. It received the top position among Indian think tanks.

History

IDSA was established on 11 November 1965 as a non-partisan and autonomous body. It is funded by the Indian Ministry of Defence and plays a key role in shaping India's foreign and security policies. In February 2020 IDSA was renamed as 'Manohar Parrikar Institute for Defence Studies and Analyses (MP-IDSA)' after former Defence Minister Manohar Parrikar.

Governance
MP-IDSA is governed by an Executive Council, whose members are distinguished personalities from various walks of life and which is headed by a president. The council is supported by committees covering different aspects of the institute's work. Executive Council Committees cover subjects such as administration, academics, finance, membership, etc. Members of the council are elected for two-year terms at the Annual General Body meeting.

The president of the Executive Council is by convention, an ex-officio position, held by the incumbent defence minister. The current president is Rajnath Singh.

Activities

Research
The institute's presently focused research areas are divided in following categories: South Asia, East Asia, Russia and Central Asia, West Asia and Africa, Europe and Americas, Military Affairs, Non-Traditional Security, Weapons of Mass Destruction, and Terrorism and International Security. The institute has a strong research faculty of more than fifty distinguished scholars drawn from academia, defence, foreign affairs, media and other civil services. The institute's state-of-the-art library, situated at the heart of the Indian capital New Delhi caters to the needs of policymakers.

Training
The institute provides training and refresher courses to senior government officers drawn from various branches of Indian Civil Service, i.e., the Indian Administrative Service, the Indian Foreign Service, the Indian Police Service, the Armed Forces and the Para-Military Forces.

International interactions
MP-IDSA has international interactions through various means. The institute holds international seminars and conferences, publishes journals, hosts to visiting scholars, and ties up with institutes from all over the world.

Government policy
The MP-IDSA plays a role in shaping the Indian government's foreign and security policies. For example; the Indian Parliament's Standing Committee on Defence frequently calls on the institute's experts. Officers of the armed forces come to spend up to two years at the institute to gain a policy perspective. The institute's annual report is tabled in the Indian Parliament.

The Defence Minister of India informed the Indian parliament in 2012 that the IDSA appoints both civilian and military personnel to publish books, journal articles and reviews.

Publications
The institute's flagship journal Strategic Analysis is published bimonthly in collaboration with Taylor & Francis. It aims to promote an understanding of Indian strategic thinking on national and international themes.

Other periodical publications include:
 Journal of Defence Studies – a quarterly journal focusing on core issues of defence.
 Africa Trends – a quarterly magazine on providing information on significant and strategic developments taking place in Africa.
 CBW Magazine – a magazine focusing on arms control, disarmament, roles of state and non-state actors, regarding chemical and biological weapons.
 Various policy briefs, issue briefs, occasional papers and newsletters.

The members of the institute actively publish various books and monographs via regular publishing houses in India and overseas.

Ranking
The Global Go To Think Tank Index, prepared annually by the University of Pennsylvania Foreign Policy Research Institute, ranked IDSA 55th in the world in 2013, 105th in 2016 and 41st in 2017. This was the top position received by any Indian think tank in 2017.

Past heads

See also

Centre for Land Warfare Studies
Centre for Air Power Studies (India)
United Service Institution
Indian Council of World Affairs
Observer Research Foundation
National Defence College (India)
 List of think tanks in India

References

External links
Official Website

Think tanks based in India
Research institutes in Delhi
Research institutes of international relations
Organisations based in Delhi
Think tanks established in 1965
Foreign policy and strategy think tanks in India
Political and economic think tanks based in India